Polecat Creek may refer to:

Polecat Creek (Iowa), a stream in Iowa
Polecat Creek (Grand River), a stream in Missouri
Polecat Creek (Wilkerson Creek), a stream in Missouri
Polecat Creek (Deep River tributary), a stream in North Carolina
Polecat Creek (Banister River tributary), a stream in Halifax County, Virginia
Polecat Creek (band), a North Carolina folk band